Teutberga (died 11 November 875) was a queen of Lotharingia by marriage to Lothair II. She was a daughter of Bosonid Boso the Elder and sister of Hucbert, the lay-abbot of St. Maurice's Abbey.

Life
For political reasons, to forge ties of kinship with the Carolingian dynasty, the imperial family of Francia, in 855 she was married to the Carolingian Lothair II, the second son of Emperor Lothair I. It is very probably that Lothar II, at the time of marriage, already had a mistress named Waldrada, who, according to historian Baron Ernouf, was of noble Gallo-Roman family, whose brother, Thietgaud, was the bishop of Trier and her uncle, Ghunter, was archbishop of Cologne, while, according to the Annales Novienses, she was the sister of Ghunter. According to the Vita Sancti Deicoli, Waldrada was related to Eberhard II, Count of Nordgau (included Strasbourg) family of Etichonids.

Queen
Soon after their marriage, Lothair's father died and Lothair II inherited Middle Francian territory west of the Rhine stretching from the North Sea to the Jura mountains. Teutberga was alledgedly not capable of bearing children and Lothair's reign was chiefly occupied by his efforts to obtain an annulment of their marriage, prompted also by his affection for Waldrada. His relations with his uncles Charles the Bald and Louis the German were influenced by his desire to obtain their support for this endeavor. Although quarrels and reconciliations between the three kings followed each other in quick succession, generally Louis favoured annulment, and Charles opposed it, while neither lost sight of the fact that Lothair had no legitimate sons to inherit his lands.

Separation
In 857 Lothair imprisoned Teutberga accusing her of incest with her brother Hucbert before their marriage. A church synod of all the bishops of Lotharingia held at the behest of Lothair II concerning his accusations was presided over by archbishops Ghunter and Thietgaud, both Waldrada's relations. But Hucbert took up arms on her behalf, and after she had submitted successfully to the ordeal of boiling water, Lothair was compelled to restore her in 858.

Still pursuing his purpose, Lothair won the support of his brother, Emperor Louis II, by a cession of lands and obtained the consent of the local clergy to the annulment and to his marriage with Waldrada, which took place in 862. A synod of Frankish bishops met at Metz in 863 and confirmed this decision. Teutberga escaped and took refuge in the court of Charles the Bald. She appealed to Pope Nicholas I who voided the decision of the synod and Lothair's marriage to Waldrada. An attack on Rome by the emperor was without result, and in 865 Lothair was threatened with excommunication and was convinced that Louis and Charles at their recent meeting had discussed the partition of his kingdom. Lothair accepted the pope's ruling and again took Teutberga back.

Later life
Teutberga, however, either from inclination or compulsion, now expressed her desire for an annulment, and Lothair went to Italy to obtain the assent of the new pope, Adrian II. Placing a favourable interpretation upon the words of the pope, he set out on the return journey, when he was seized with fever and died at Piacenza on 8 August 869. Teutberga then retired to the abbey of St. Glossinde of Metz until her death on 11 November 875.

The illegitimate status of Lothair II's only son, Hugo, by Waldrada, was not rectified before Lothair's death, and Lothair's kingdom was divided between his uncles Charles the Bald and Louis the German by the Treaty of Meerssen.

References

Bibliography
  Baron Ernouf (1858) Histoire de Waldrade, de Lother II et de leurs descendants (Paris).

Bosonids
Frankish queens consort
Carolingian dynasty
Lotharingian queens consort
875 deaths

Year of birth unknown
Women from the Carolingian Empire
9th-century women
Repudiated queens
9th-century Lotharingian people